Alagappan N is an Indian cinematographer who works primarily in Malayalam Cinema. He received graduate diploma in cinematography from the M.G.R. Government Film and Television Training Institute in Chennai. In 2013, he made his directional debut Malayalam film Pattam Pole.

Career
He started his career at Doordarshan Kendra, Jalandhar, Doordarshan Kendra, Thiruvananthapuram and Agartala in Tripura, India from 1980 to 1995 as a cameraman.
In 1997 he made his debut film as a Cinematographer in Sammanam (1997 film). Then he worked in Agnisakshi (1999 film),directed by Shyamaprasad. His notable works are Ore Kadal, Vasanthiyum Lakshmiyum Pinne Njaanum, Salute, Soothradharan, Nandanam (film), Thilakkam, Mizhi Randilum, Gaurisankaram, Manassinakkare, Kaazhcha, Achuvinte Amma, Chandrolsavam, Chanthupottu, Rasathanthram, Prajapathi, Photographer (film), Chotta Mumbai, Irumbukkottai Murattu Singam, Chocolate (2007 film), Thalappavu, Bumm Bumm Bole, Arike, Oru Marubhoomikkadha, Ozhimuri, Pattam Pole and Welcome to Central Jail.

Awards

Awards for Best Cinematography for Movies
 Kerala State Award for Best Cinematography 1998 – Film – Agnisakshi (1999 film)
 Kerala Film Critics Association Award for Best Cinematography 1999 – Film – Agnisakshi (1999 film)
 Mathrubhumi-Medimix Award 2000 for Best Cinematography 2000 – Film – Vasanthiyum Lakshmiyum Pinne Njaanum
 Kerala Film Critics Association Award for Best Cinematography 2002  – Film – Nandanam (film)
 Mathrubhumi-Medimix Award 2000 for Best Cinematography 2002 – Film – Nandanam (film)
 Asianet Award 2004 for Best Cinematography 2004 – Film – Kaazhcha
 Vanitha Award 2006 for Best Cinematography 2006 – Film – Rasathanthram
 Mathrubhumi Award 2006 for Best Cinematography 2006 – Film – Rasathanthram
 Kala Keralam Award 2006 for Best Cinematography 2006 – Film – Rasathanthram
 Malayalam Movie Award 2007 AMMA held in Dubai for Best Cinematography 2007 – Film – Ore Kadal
 Jeevan TV film Award 2007 for Best Cinematography 2007 – Film – Photographer (film)
 Film Critics Award for Best Cinematography 2007  – Film – Ore Kadal
 SICA Award for Best Cinematography 2007  – Film – Ore Kadal
 Film Critics Award for Best Cinematography 2012  – Film – Ozhimuri

Awards for Television
Kerala State Government Awards for Best Cameraman
 Uyarthezhunnelppu- 1993
 Maratam Durbalam - 1996
 Ganitham         - 1997
 Thottagal        - 1998

Onida Pinnacle National Awards for Best Cameraman
 Nilavariyunnu - 1995

Centre for Media Studies Awards for Best Cameraman
 Maratam Durbalam - 1997

Film Critics Awards for Best Cameraman
 ANNA - 2000

Kerala State Television Awards for Best Director
ANNA - 2000

Jury Chairman

Guest interactive faculty
GRD College Coimbatore
C DIT, Trivandram
LV Prasad Film Institute, Trivandram and Chennai
Revathy Kalamandir Film Academy, Trivandram
Asianet News Trainees
Flowers Academy Media Science
KR Narayan National Institute of Visual Science
Elements of Cinema Film School, Kochi

Filmography

References

Further reading
 
 

Living people
Malayalam film directors
Malayalam film cinematographers
Malayalam film producers
Film producers from Thiruvananthapuram
Film directors from Thiruvananthapuram
Cinematographers from Kerala
1957 births